Luisia, commonly known as velvet orchids or 钗子股属 (chai zi gu shu), is a genus of epiphytic or lithophytic orchids in family Orchidaceae. Plants in this genus have flattened roots, long leafy stems, narrow, thick, leathery leaves and short-lived flowers that open sporadically. There are about forty species found from tropical and subtropical Asia to the Western Pacific.

Description
Orchids in the genus Luisia are epiphytic or lithophytic, monopodial herbs with long, fibrous stems and thick, more or less flattened roots. A large number of cylinder-shaped, narrow leathery leaves are arranged along the stems. Up to ten resupinate, usually small, fleshy flowers are arranged on a short, thickened flowering stem and open sporadically. Each flower has a short, curved stalk and petals that are longer than the sepals. The labellum is large and fleshy with an upper epichile separated by a groove from the lower concave hypochile. The labellum has a rigid connection to the column.

Taxonomy and naming
The genus Luisia was first formally described in 1829 by Charles Gaudichaud-Beaupré and the description was published in Voyage autour du monde fait par ordre du Roi sur les corvettes de S. M. l'Uranie et la Physicienne. The name Luisia honours Don Luis de Torres who assisted the French expedition at Guam.

Distribution
Orchids in the genus Luisia occur in Bhutan, China, India, Indochina, Indonesia, Japan, Malaysia, New Guinea the Philippines, Sri Lanka, Thailand, Australia, Micronesia and Melanesia.

Species list 
The following is a list of species of Luisia accepted by the World Checklist of Selected Plant Families as at December 2018:

 Luisia abrahami  Vatsala in A.Abraham & P.Vatsala, 1981
 Luisia amesiana   Rolfe, 1893
 Luisia antennifera  Blume, 1849 
 Luisia appressifolia Aver., 2000 
 Luisia balakrishnanii S.Misra 2010
 Luisia brachystachys   (Lindl.) Blume, 1849
 Luisia cantharis  Rolfe, 1895 
 Luisia celebica Schltr., 1911 
 Luisia confusa Rchb.f. in W.G.Walpers, 1863 
 Luisia cordatilabia Ames & Quisumb. (1933, publ. 1934)
 Luisia curtisii Seidenf., 1997 
 Luisia filiformis  Hook.f., 1890 
 Luisia foxworthii Ames, 1908 
 Luisia hancockii Rolfe, 1896 
 Luisia javanica  J.J.Sm., 1914 
 Luisia jonesii J.J.Sm., 1914  
 Luisia longispica  Z.H.Tsi & S.C.Chen, 1994 
 Luisia lui T.C.Hsu & S.W.Chung 2010
 Luisia macrantha  Blatt. & McCann, 1932 
 Luisia macrotis  Rchb.f., 1869 
 Luisia magniflora  Z.H.Tsi & S.C.Chen, 1994 
 Luisia megasepala  Hayata, 1914 
 Luisia microptera  Rchb.f., 1870 
 Luisia morsei  Rolfe, 1903 
 Luisia occidentalis Lindl. 1853
 Luisia parviflora Aver. 2015
 Luisia primulina   C.S.P.Parish & Rchb.f., 1874 
 Luisia psyche   Rchb.f., 1863 
 Luisia ramosii  Ames, 1911 
 Luisia recurva  Seidenf., 1971 
 Luisia secunda  Seidenf., 1971 
 Luisia taurina  J.J.Sm., 1910 
 Luisia tenuifolia  Blume, 1849 
 Luisia teres  (Thunb.) Blume, 1849 
 Luisia thailandica   Seidenf., 1971
 Luisia trichorhiza   (Hook.) Blume, 1849 
 Luisia tristis   (G.Forst.) Hook.f., 1890 
 Luisia unguiculata  J.J.Sm., 1926
 Luisia volucris  Lindl., 1853 
 Luisia zeylanica Lindl. 1853
 Luisia zollingeri  Rchb.f. in W.G.Walpers, 1863

Intergeneric hybrids 
x  Aeridisia (Aerides x Luisia)
x Aeridovanisia  (Aerides x Luisia x Vanda)
x Ascogastisia (Ascocentrum x Gastrochilus x Luisia)
x Debruyneara   (Ascocentrum x Luisia x Vanda)
x Dominyara  (Ascocentrum x Luisia x Neofinetia x Rhynchostylis )
x Gastisia   (Gastrochilus x Luisia)
x Gastisocalpa  (Gastrochilus x Luisia x Pomatocalpa)
x Goffara   (Luisia x Rhynchostylis  x Vanda)
x Luascotia (Ascocentrum x Luisia x Neofinetia)
x Luicentrum (Ascocentrum x Luisia)
x Luichilus (Luisia x Sarcochilus)
x Luinetia  (Luisia x Neofinetia)
x Luinopsis  (Luisia x Phalaenopsis)
x Luisanda  (Luisia x Vanda)
x Luistylis  (Luisia x Rhynchostylis )
x Luivanetia (Luisia x Neofinetia x Vanda)
x Pageara  (Ascocentrum x Luisia x Rhynchostylis x Vanda)
x Papilisia (Papilionanthe x Luisia) One species of Papilionanthe was re-classified as a hybrid with this genus (× Papilisia taiwaniana)
x Pomatisia  (Luisia x Pomatocalpa)
x Scottara (Aerides x Arachnis x Luisia)
x Trautara  (Doritis x Luisia x Phalaenopsis)

References

 
Vandeae genera
Epiphytic orchids